West Fork Township is one of sixteen townships in Franklin County, Iowa, United States.  As of the 2010 census, its population was 143 and it contained 77 housing units.

History
West Fork Township was created in 1868. It is named from the west fork of the Cedar River.

Geography

Cemeteries
The township contains West Fork Cemetery.

School districts
 Hampton-Dumont Community School District
 West Fork Community School District

Political districts
 Iowa's 4th congressional district
 State House District 54
 State Senate District 27

References

External links
 City-Data.com

Townships in Iowa
Townships in Franklin County, Iowa
1868 establishments in Iowa